This Christmas is a 2007 American Christmas comedy film produced by Rainforest Films and distributed by Screen Gems. Written, produced, and directed by Preston A. Whitmore II, it is a Christmas-time story that centers on the Whitfield family, whose eldest has come home for the first time in four years. The film is named after the 1970 Donny Hathaway song of the same name, which Chris Brown covers in the film.
The Whitfield family overcomes many trials and obstacles during the Christmas season.

Plot
It is the holiday season, and the Whitfields are celebrating together. The matriarch, Shirley Ann "Ma'Dere" Whitfield (Loretta Devine), and her boyfriend, Joe (Delroy Lindo) are joined by her 6 children: eldest child, Quentin, Jr. (Idris Elba) a musician who is always on the go and has not been home in 4 years... much like their father who abandoned them; eldest daughter, Lisa (Regina King), a housewife, her cheating husband, Malcolm (Laz Alonso) and their two kids; the uppity one, Kelli (Sharon Leal), a Harvard grad visiting from New York; Claude (Columbus Short), a U.S. Marine; baby girl, Melanie "Mel" (Lauren London), seven-year college student accompanied by her boyfriend, Devan (Keith Robinson); and the youngest of the bunch, Michael "Baby" (Chris Brown), a photographer and aspiring musician.

It is Christmas Eve and everyone is starting to arrive for dinner at 6:00. Problems arise soon after when Malcolm prompts Lisa to suggest that they should all give up their share of their family-owned dry cleaners. Everyone else is against it and an argument breaks out between Lisa and Kelli as a result.

Soon after, Quentin arrives, and he talks to his family at the dinner table; upon seeing Joe, he becomes cold and rude towards him. In the kitchen, Mel informs Devan about Ma'Dere's ex-husband "Senior", who left the family to pursue a musical career. Quentin finds Joe and threatens him again. When Joe leaves, Quentin plays Senior's piano in the garage. Claude attempts to sneak off to a club, causing Kelli, Quentin, and Mel to join him. They witness Baby singing "Try a Little Tenderness" there, the family is astonished to find out he can sing. Kelli and Gerald (Mekhi Phifer) meet and have an instant attraction. Claude loses his temper with two men who attempt to hit on his (unbeknownst to the rest of the family) wife, Sandi (Jessica Stroup), and he pulls his gun out at the club, causing the Whitfields to flee.

At the house, Baby convinces his siblings to keep his singing talent a secret until he confronts Ma'Dere himself. The next day, the men look for a Christmas tree. Meanwhile, Kelli, Lisa, and Mel wrap presents and Kelli confesses that she slept with Gerald. Mel encourages Kelli to enjoy her fling while Lisa chides her for being reckless. At the airport, Lisa becomes suspicious of Malcolm, who has to leave because of issues at his "job". Lisa comes home with Mo and Dude, 2 bookies who are owed money by Quentin. They attempt to beat him until he tells them that a police car is nearby.

Claude is arrested and Lisa and Quentin go to the station to fix the situation. Ma'Dere scolds the family for not cooking dinner or getting prepared for Christmas. When Lisa and Quentin return, they tell everyone that Claude is AWOL and the family is shocked to meet Sandi, who is revealed to be Claude's wife. Mo and Dude take advantage of Quentin by eating with his family. Sandi privately explains to Mel why Claude is AWOL and eventually admits that she is pregnant. Meanwhile, Quentin confronts Ma'Dere about her relationship with Joe and why no one told him that she and Senior were divorced.

Outside, Kelli talks to Lisa about the events that took place, and Lisa also tells her that even though she did not get a college degree, she had to help their mom with the dry-cleaning business when Kelli went to Harvard. Kelli admits that Malcolm is cheating; Lisa confesses that she already knows. Kelli says that 'sharing her man with another woman is pathetic', leading to a fight between Lisa and Kelli in the rain. When Mel breaks up the fight, she tells Kelli about Sandi's pregnancy and that Claude does not know about it. In the meantime, Lisa angrily totals Malcolm's car when she drives it into the Los Angeles River. Gerald arrives and spends the night with Kelli. Baby gives Quentin a scrapbook of Christmas pictures before he leaves. Baby finally confesses to Ma'Dere that he wants to be a singer, but she refuses to listen.

Quentin goes to the train station but is ambushed by Mo and Dude; Joe shows up to defend him. Joe gives the bookies $10,000 to get them to leave Quentin alone, and they do. Despite Joe's pleas, Quentin boards his train. The next morning, Kelli asks Gerald to come to visit her in New York. Malcolm returns and Lisa decides to do something about his cheating. She persuades him to take a shower while she covers the floor in baby oil. When he asks about his truck, she confronts him about his infidelity, lures him out of the shower onto the slippery floor, and beats him repeatedly with a belt. Afterwards, she meets Kelli on the porch before church and lets her know that he left, that she is filing for a divorce and starting over.

At church, Baby sings "This Christmas" and Claude arrives at the church after being released. After the church service, Quentin returns and reconciles with Joe and his family. The cast members are seen dancing to "Got to Give It Up" (via a Soul Train line) before the end-credits roll.

Cast
 Loretta Devine as Shirley Ann “Ma'Dere” Whitfield
 Delroy Lindo as Joe Black
 Idris Elba as Quentin Whitfield, Jr.
 Regina King as Lisa Whitfield-Moore
 Sharon Leal as Kelli Whitfield
 Columbus Short as Claude Whitfield 
 Lauren London as Melanie Whitfield
 Chris Brown as Michael “Baby” Whitfield 
 Laz Alonso as Malcolm Moore 
 Ricky Harris as Cousin Fred Whitfield
 Keith Robinson as Devan Brooks
 Jessica Stroup as Sandi Whitfield, Claude's wife
 Lupe Ontiveros as Rosie
 David Banner as Mo
 Ronnie Warner as Dude
 Mekhi Phifer as Gerald
 Amy Hunter as Karen

Reception
On review aggregator Rotten Tomatoes, the film holds an approval rating of 54% based on 83 reviews, with an average rating of 5.9/10. The website'scritics' consensus reads: "This Christmas features strong performances and a sharp portrayal of family dynamics, but relies too heavily on holiday movie clichés." On Metacritic, the film has a weighted average score of 63 out of 100, based on 24 critics, indicating "generally favorable reviews".

The film opened the box office at number two behind Enchanted. The film became a box office hit after opening with $17,958,183. It went on to gross $49,121,934 domestically on a budget of just $13 million.

DVD and Blu-ray release
This Christmas was released on DVD and Blu-ray Disc on November 11, 2008.

Original soundtrack
The This Christmas soundtrack was released by Jive Records on November 20, 2007. 

This Christmas - Chris Brown - 3:18
I'll Be Home for Christmas (Waiting On Remix) - Jordin Sparks - 3:13
Jingle Bells - B2K - 3:18
Try a Little Tenderness - Chris Brown - 6:14
Merry Christmas Baby - Charles Brown - 4:49
Silent Night - Boney James Feat. Anthony Hamilton - 5:16
Please Come Home for Christmas - Aaron Neville - 2:52
I Never Loved a Man (The Way I Love You) - Aretha Franklin - 2:50
Got to Give It Up, Part 1 - Marvin Gaye - 4:13
Have Yourself a Merry Little Christmas - Luther Vandross - 5:05
The Christmas Song - Toni Braxton - 3:25
Santa Baby - Lina - 3:20
Sleigh Ride - TLC - 3:44
O Holy Night - Denetria Champ - 4:33

Awards and nominations

Asian Excellence Awards
Outstanding Actress in a Movie: (Sharon Leal), Winner
Image Awards
Outstanding Supporting Actress in a Motion Picture: (Loretta Devine), Nominated
Outstanding Directing in a Motion Picture: (Preston A Whitmore II), Nominated
MTV Movie Awards
Breakthrough Performance: (Chris Brown), Nominated

See also
 List of Christmas films

References

External links
 Official site
 
 
 
 
 

2007 films
2007 drama films
2007 comedy films
2000s English-language films
American Christmas films
African-American musical films
Films produced by Will Packer
Rainforest Films films
Screen Gems films
African-American films
2000s Christmas films
2000s American films